HIStory: Past, Present and Future, Book I is the ninth studio album by the American singer Michael Jackson, released on June 20, 1995. It was Jackson's fifth album released through Epic Records, and the first on his label MJJ Productions. It comprises two discs: HIStory Begins, a greatest hits compilation, and HIStory Continues, comprising new material written and produced by Jackson and collaborators. The album includes appearances by Janet Jackson, Shaquille O'Neal, Slash, and the Notorious B.I.G. The genres span R&B, pop, and hip hop, with elements of hard rock and funk rock. The themes include environmental awareness, isolation, greed, suicide, injustice, and Jackson's conflicts with the media.

Starting in the late 1980s, Jackson and the tabloid press had a difficult relationship. In 1993, the relationship between Jackson and the press collapsed when he was accused of child sexual abuse. Although he was not charged, Jackson was subject to intense media scrutiny while the criminal investigation took place. Several of the album's 15 new songs pertain to the child sexual abuse allegations made against him in 1993 and Jackson's perceived mistreatment by the media, mainly the tabloids. Because of this, HIStory has been described as Jackson's most "personal" album.

HIStory debuted at number one on the Billboard 200 albums chart in the United States, and in nineteen other countries. Seven singles were released, including the protest songs "Earth Song" and "They Don't Care About Us". "Scream", a duet between Jackson and his sister Janet, became the first song to debut in the top five of the US Billboard Hot 100, reaching number five. "You Are Not Alone" was the first song in history to debut at number one on the Billboard Hot 100; it was Jackson's final number-one single on that chart. Though the album received generally positive reviews, the lyrics of "They Don't Care About Us" drew accusations of antisemitism; Jackson said they had been misinterpreted and replaced them on later pressings of the album.

Jackson later embarked on the HIStory World Tour, which grossed $165 million (equivalent to $268 million in 2019), making it the highest-grossing solo concert tour of the 1990s. It was Jackson's third and final concert tour as a solo artist. The album has sold over 20 million copies worldwide, making it one of the best-selling albums of all time, and one of the best-selling multi-disc albums of all time. In August 2018, it was certified 8× Platinum by the Recording Industry Association of America (RIAA). It was nominated for five Grammy Awards at the 1996 Grammy Awards, including Album of the Year, winning Best Music Video – Short Form for "Scream". Jackson won an American Music Award for Favorite Pop/Rock Male Artist at the 1996 American Music Awards.

Background
Starting in the late 1980s, Jackson and the tabloid press had a difficult relationship. In 1986, tabloids claimed that Jackson slept in a hyperbaric oxygen chamber and had offered to buy the bones of Joseph Merrick (the "Elephant Man"), both of which Jackson denied. These stories inspired the derogatory nickname "Wacko Jacko", which Jackson despised. He stopped leaking untruths to the press, and the media began creating their own stories. In 1989, Jackson released "Leave Me Alone", a song about the victimization he felt by the press.

In 1993, the relationship between Jackson and the press collapsed when he was accused of child sexual abuse. Although he was not charged, Jackson was subject to intense media scrutiny while the criminal investigation took place. Complaints about the coverage and media included misleading and sensational headlines; paying for stories of Jackson's alleged criminal activity and confidential material from the police investigation; using unflattering pictures of Jackson; and using headlines that strongly implied Jackson's guilt. In 1994, Jackson said of the media coverage: "I am particularly upset by the handling of the matter by the incredible, terrible mass media. At every opportunity, the media has dissected and manipulated these allegations to reach their own conclusions."

Jackson began taking painkillers, Valium, Xanax and Ativan to deal with the stress of the allegations. A few months after the allegations became news, Jackson stopped eating. Soon after, Jackson's health deteriorated to the extent that he canceled the remainder of his Dangerous World Tour and went into rehabilitation. Jackson booked the whole fourth floor of a clinic and was put on Valium IV to wean him from painkillers. The media showed Jackson little sympathy. In 1993, the Daily Mirror held a "Spot the Jacko" contest, offering readers a trip to Disney World if they could correctly predict where Jackson would appear next. The same year, a Daily Express headline read "Drug Treatment Star Faces Life on the Run", while a News of the World headline accused Jackson of being a fugitive; these tabloids also falsely alleged that Jackson had traveled to Europe to have cosmetic surgery that would make him unrecognizable on his return. In early November 1993, talk show host Geraldo Rivera set up a mock trial with a jury of audience members, though Jackson had not been charged with a crime.

Content 
HIStory was Jackson's first studio album since his 1991 album Dangerous and his first new material after being accused of child sexual abuse.  The album comprises two discs. The first, HIStory Begins, is a compilation of songs from Jackson's albums Off the Wall (1979), Thriller (1982), Bad (1987) and Dangerous (1991). The second, HIStory Continues, comprises new material recorded from September 1994 to March 1995. Jackson co-wrote and co-produced a majority of the new songs; other writers include Jimmy Jam and Terry Lewis, Dallas Austin, the Notorious B.I.G., Bruce Swedien, R. Kelly and René Moore, and other producers include David Foster and Bill Bottrell.

Similarly to Thriller and Bad, HIStory contains lyrics that deal with paranoia. Several of the album's 15 new songs pertain to the child sexual abuse allegations made against him in 1993 and Jackson's perceived mistreatment by the media, mainly the tabloids. Because of this, the album has been described as being Jackson's most "personal". Two of the album's new tracks are covers. The genres of the songs on the album span R&B, pop, hip hop, elements of hard rock ("D.S.") and funk rock ("Scream"), and ballads. The lyrics pertain to isolation, greed, environmental concerns, injustice. "Scream" is a duet with Jackson's sister Janet; with "spitting" lyrics about injustice.

The lyrics for the R&B ballad "You Are Not Alone", written by R. Kelly, pertain to isolation. Two Belgian songwriters, brothers Eddy and Danny Van Passel, claimed to have written the melody in 1993. In September 2007, a Belgian judge ruled the song had been plagiarized from the Van Passel brothers, and it was banned from radio play in Belgium. "D.S.", a hard rock song, has lyrics about a "cold man" named "Dom S. Sheldon". Critics interpreted it as an attack on Thomas Sneddon, who had led the prosecution in Jackson's trial.

"Money" was interpreted as being directed at Evan Chandler, the father of the boy who accused Jackson of child sexual abuse. The lyrics of "Childhood" pertain to Jackson's childhood. Similar to "Scream", the lyrics to "They Don't Care About Us" pertain to injustice, as well as racism. In "This Time Around", Jackson asserts himself as having been "falsely accused". The song includes a guest rap by the Notorious B.I.G. (aka Biggie Smalls). "Earth Song" was described as a "slow blues-operatic", and its lyrics pertain to environmental concerns. On HIStory, Jackson covered Charlie Chaplin's "Smile" and the Beatles' "Come Together".

"2 Bad" was influenced by hip-hop, with a sample of Run–D.M.C.'s “King of Rock” and another guest rap verse by Shaquille O'Neal. The similarity in lyrics and name have led to some seeing it as a spiritual successor to Jackson's 1987 track, "Bad". "Stranger in Moscow" is a pop ballad that is interspersed with sounds of rain, in which Jackson references a "swift and sudden fall from grace". "Tabloid Junkie" is a hard funk song with lyrics instructing listeners to not believe everything they read in the media and tabloids. The album's title track, "HIStory" contained multiple samples, including Martin Luther King Jr.'s "I Have a Dream" speech. "HIStory" was not released as a single from HIStory, but its remix was from Blood on the Dance Floor: HIStory in the Mix in 1997.

As an introduction for "Little Susie", Jackson used his own variation of Pie Jesu from Maurice Duruflé's Requiem. Some speculate, the inspiration behind the song likely came from an artist called Gottfried Helnwein. An urban legend states that Little Susie was written about a girl called Susie Condry who was murdered in 1972. However no evidence of this event can be found. Jackson admired Helnwein's work and had purchased some of his paintings. One of them, "Beautiful Victim", inspired the song. Helnwein later painted a portrait of Michael. There appears to be a similarity between the "Beautiful Victim" painting and the artwork included for the song in HIStory.

Controversy

Accusations of antisemitism
On June 15, 1995, The New York Times said that "They Don't Care About Us" contained antisemitic slurs in the lines "Jew me, sue me, everybody do me / Kick me, kike me, don't you black or white me". In a statement, Jackson responded:

Jackson's manager and record label said the lyrics opposed prejudice and had been taken out of context. The following day, David A. Lehrer and Rabbi Marvin Hier, leaders of two Jewish organizations, stated that Jackson's attempt to make a song critical of discrimination had backfired. They felt the lyrics might be ambiguous and were unsuitable for young audiences because they might not understand the song's context. They acknowledged that Jackson meant well and suggested that he write an explanation in the album booklet. In his review of HIStory, Jon Pareles of The New York Times wrote that the song "gives the lie to his entire catalogue of brotherhood anthems with a burst of anti-Semitism".

On June 17, Jackson promised that future copies of the album would include an apology, and concluded: "I just want you all to know how strongly I am committed to tolerance, peace and love, and I apologize to anyone who might have been hurt." On June 23, Jackson announced that "Jew me" and "kike me" would be replaced with "do me" and "strike me" on future copies of the album. He reiterated his acceptance that the song was offensive to some. Spike Lee, who would direct the music videos for "They Don't Care About Us", said that he felt there was a double standard in the music industry, and that the word "nigger" in music does not cause controversy. Rapper Notorious B.I.G. used the word "nigga" on another song on the album, "This Time Around", but it did not attract media attention.

Music videos

HIStorys music videos displayed different themes and elements, while some of them encouraged awareness of poverty and had a positive effect on their shooting locations. The promo for "They Don't Care About Us" was directed by Spike Lee; Jackson said that Lee chose to direct the video because the song "has an edge, and Spike Lee had approached me. It's a public awareness song and that's what he is all about. It's a protest kind of song... and I think he was perfect for it." Jackson also collaborated with 200 members of the cultural group Olodum, who played music in the video. The resulting media interest exposed Olodum to 140 countries, bringing them worldwide fame and increasing their status in Brazil. Lúcia Nagib, of The New Brazilian Cinema, said of the music video: 

In 2009, Billboard described the area as "now a model for social development" and stated that Jackson's influence was partially responsible for this improvement. For the first time in Jackson's career, he made a second music video for a single. This second version was filmed in a prison with cellmates; the video shows Jackson handcuffed and contains real footage of police attacking African Americans, the Ku Klux Klan, genocide, execution, and other human rights abuses. Jackson's music video for "Earth Song" received praise for its environmental recognition. In 1995, the video received a Genesis Award for Doris Day Music Award, given each year for animal sensitivity. In 2008, a writer for the Nigeria Exchange said that "'Earth Song' drew the world's attention to the degradation and bastardization of the earth as a fall out of various human activities".

Two other music videos from HIStory have been influential. Jackson's "Stranger In Moscow" music video influenced the advertising campaign for International Cricket Council Champions Trophy 2004, which featured "a series of smart outdoor ads and a classy TV spot". The television commercial was inspired by "Stranger In Moscow"s video where "the maiden in black splash about in the rain, with kids playing cricket for company". "Scream" was a creative influence on other music videos such as "No Scrubs" (1999) by TLC. This influence was also present on the 2008 release of "Shawty Get Loose" by rapper Lil Mama.

Promotion 
 Sony Music spent $30 million to promote the album. The music press were anticipating how well it would sell. One analyst for SoundScan expressed the opinion that the press was out of touch with the public when it came to Jackson; the public liked him, while the press did not. He believed that "naysayers" in the media would be left surprised with the commercial reception.

Also, during this period of time, Jackson did a series of personal appearances, becoming the first time that he faced the public eye following the allegations. On June 14, 1995, Jackson did the interview TV special "Primetime Live" along with his then wife Lisa Marie Presley and the interviewer Diane Sawyer. The special was watched by an audience 60 million in the United States and 500 millions worldwide. However, it received mixed reviews by critics. On September 7, 1995, he opened the MTV Video Music Awards with a 15 minutes medley.

"Smile", "This Time Around" and "D.S." were released as promotional singles in 1995 and December 1997. Due to lack of radio airplay, "Smile" and "D.S." did not chart on any music charts worldwide. "This Time Around", was released as a radio-only single in the United States in December 1995. The song peaked at number 23 on the Billboard Hot R&B Singles chart and at number 18 on the Billboard Hot Dance Music/Club Play chart solely off radio airplay.

To promote the album, Jackson embarked on the HIStory World Tour, which grossed $165 million (equivalent to $268 million in 2019). It was Jackson's third and final concert tour as a solo artist. The tour, beginning in Prague, Czech Republic on September 7, 1996, attracted more than 4.5 million fans from 58 cities in 35 countries around the world. The average concert attendance was 54,878 and the tour lasted 82 tour dates. Jackson performed no concerts in the United States, besides two concerts in January 1997 in Hawaii at the Aloha Stadium, to a crowd of 35,000 each; he was the first artist to sell out the stadium. VIP seats cost, on average, $200 per person. Each concert lasted an estimated two hours and ten minutes. The tour concluded in Durban, South Africa on October 15, 1997.

The album cover depicts a 10-foot sculpture of Jackson in a "warrior-like" pose, created in 1994 by Diana Walczak. To promote the tour, Epic placed ten 30-foot replicas of the statue in locations around the world, including the River Thames in London, Alexanderplatz in Berlin, Eindhoven in the Netherlands, and the pedestal of the destroyed Stalin Monument in Prague. The statues were built over three months by a team of 30, made from steel and fiberglass, and weighed around 20,000 pounds each. Another statue, built from wood and plaster, was placed at the Los Angeles Tower Records store. In 2016, the original statue was installed at the Mandalay Bay casino in Las Vegas.

Singles
Six singles were released from HIStory. "Scream"/"Childhood" was the first single released in May 1995. "Scream" was sung and performed by Jackson and his sister Janet Jackson. The single had the best ever debut at number five - where it peaked, on the Billboard Hot 100. The song received a Grammy nomination for "Best Pop Collaboration With Vocals". The music video for "Scream" is one of Jackson's most critically acclaimed songs and music videos, receiving numerous awards. With a US$9 million music video production budget, "Scream" is the most expensive music video ever made as of 2015.

"You Are Not Alone" was the second single released from HIStory. Having debuted at number one on the Billboard Hot 100 on September 2, 1995, it became the first song to debut at number one on the chart, succeeding the record previously held from Jackson's "Scream" single. "You Are Not Alone" was released in August 1995, and it topped the charts in various international markets, including the United Kingdom, France, and Spain. The song was seen as a major artistic and commercial success.

"Earth Song" was the third single released in November 1995. "Earth Song" did not chart on Billboard 100. Internationally, the song topped four countries' charts, as well as charting within the top-ten in nine other nations. The song topped the UK Singles Chart for six weeks over Christmas in 1995 and sold one million copies there, making it his most successful United Kingdom single, surpassing the success of his single "Billie Jean".

"This Time Around" was released as the album's fourth single on December 26, 1995, with a guest rap by the Notorious B.I.G. It was the album's first promotional single, and was released in the United States only. Tag lines for a December 1995 HBO special were heavily marketed on the copies of this single, but the special was canceled after Jackson had fallen ill.

"They Don't Care About Us" was the fifth single. "They Don't Care About Us" peaked at number thirty on the Billboard 100, and it charted within the top-ten of Billboards Hot Dance Music and Hot R&B Singles Charts. The song charted better in other countries compared to the United States, managing to chart within the top-ten in fourteen countries. "They Don't Care About Us" topped the German Singles chart for three weeks, while peaking at number two in Spain, number three in Austria, Sweden, and Switzerland, as well as charting at number four in France, the United Kingdom and the Netherlands.

"Stranger in Moscow" was released as the sixth and final single in November 1996. The song was well received by critics. In the United States, the song peaked at number ninety one on the Billboard Hot 100. Outside of the United States, the song was a success, topping in Spain and Italy, while peaking within the top-ten in the United Kingdom, Switzerland, and New Zealand, among others.

"Smile" was originally intended to be the album's seventh and final single, and was to be released in CD and 12" format on January 20, 1998. However, the release was canceled due to unknown reasons, and most of the copies were subsequently destroyed. Only a few copies were sent out for airplay.

Commercial performance 
HIStory debuted at number one on the Billboard 200 and Top R&B/Hip-Hop Albums charts selling over 391,000 copies in its first week. In its second week, the album stayed at the top with 263,000 copies sold, a decline of 33%. In its third week, it slipped to number 2 with 142,000 copies sold, a 46% decline. However, the album spent just six weeks at the top 10, selling over one million copies in total. By the end of 1995, the album had sold more than 1.9 million units. According to SoundScan, the set fell short of many observers' expectations. Eventually, as of 2009, the album had sold 2.5 million copies in the United States (5 million units in total). The album has further sold 730,000 copies through BMG music club as of February 2003. The album was certified eight times platinum by the Recording Industry Association of America (RIAA) on August 23, 2018, in the United States. Because HIStory is a double disc album, its CDs are therefore counted separately for certification purposes, meaning the album achieved platinum status in the United States after 500,000 copies were shipped, not one million.

However, the album was a massive success in other countries. In Europe, before it was released, three million copies were shipped, breaking records as the most shipped album ever. The International Federation of the Phonographic Industry certified HIStory six times platinum, denoting six million shipments within the continent, including 1.5 million in Germany and 1.2 million shipments in the United Kingdom.

In the United Kingdom, the album debuted at number one and sold 100,000 copies in just two days. It was certified 4× platinum by the BPI.  Eventually, it sold 1.6 million copies.

In Australia, an advance order of 130,000 copies was the largest initial shipment in Sony Australia's history. In first two days HIStory sold 30,000 units in Spain and 75,000 units in Italy. In Spain, HIStory was the 20th best selling album of 1995 and the 12th best selling album by a foreign artist. In Chile, the album topped the charts and broke all sales records in the country when it sold 25,000 units within 72 hours of its release on June 16.

HIStory: Past, Present and Future, Book I has sold over 20 million copies worldwide, making it simultaneously one of the best-selling multiple-disc releases and one of the best-selling albums of all time The greatest hits disc was reissued as a single disc on November 13, 2001, under the title Greatest Hits: HIStory, Volume I and had sold four million copies worldwide by 2010. The second disc was released separately in some European countries in 2011.

Critical reception 
HIStory received generally positive reviews. Jon Pareles of The New York Times wrote that "It has been a long time since Michael Jackson was simply a performer. He's the main asset of his own corporation, which is a profitable subsidiary of Sony." Some reviewers commented on the unusual format of a new studio album being accompanied by a "greatest hits" collection, with Q magazine saying "from the new songs' point of view, it's like taking your dad with you into a fight." Fred Shuster of the Daily News of Los Angeles described "This Time Around", "Money" and "D.S." as "superb slices of organic funk that will fuel many of the summer's busiest dance floors".

James Hunter of Rolling Stone gave HIStory four-out-of-five stars and found that it "unfolds in Jackson's outraged response to everything he has encountered in the last year or so." Hunter felt it was an "odd, charmless second chapter" compared to Jackson's earlier hits. However, he described "This Time Around" as a "dynamite jam" that was "ripe for remixes", and "Scream" and "Tabloid Junkie" as "adventurous". He said "Earth Song" had "noble sentiments" and sounded "primarily like a showpiece". Jim Farber of the New York Daily News gave the album a mixed review and commented that he would give the first disc on its own. Jon Pareles of The New York Times believed that Jackson "muttered" lyrics such as "They thought they really had control of me". Chris Willman of the Los Angeles Times said of "This Time Around", "a tough, rhythm-guitar-driven track co-written and co-produced by hit-maker Dallas Austin that sports one of the album's better grooves".

Stephen Thomas Erlewine of Allmusic gave HIStory three-out-of-five stars, but commented that it was a "monumental achievement" of Jackson's ego. Erlewine remarked that on the HIStory Begins CD, it contains "some of the greatest music in pop history" but that it leaves some hits out, citing "Say Say Say" and "Dirty Diana" — commenting that "yet it's filled with enough prime material to be thoroughly intoxicating". Erlewine noted that HIStory Continues is "easily the most personal album Jackson has recorded" and that its songs' lyrics referencing the molestation accusations create a "thick atmosphere of paranoia". He cited "You Are Not Alone" and "Scream" as being "well-crafted pop that ranks with his best material", but concludes that "nevertheless, HIStory Continues stands as his weakest album since the mid-'70s." David Browne of Entertainment Weekly, gave "HIStory Begins" an "A−" grade but the album's new material a "C−", which "winds up a B" for the entire album. Browne commented that the music "rarely seems to transport him (and thereby us) to a higher plane."

Controversy with the album came with Jackson having to rerecord some lyrics in "They Don't Care About Us" after he was accused of antisemitism, and contributor R. Kelly was accused of having plagiarized one of the album's songs, "You Are Not Alone", leading to its banning on Belgian radio.

HIStory was nominated for six Grammy Awards at the 1996 and 1997 ceremonies respectively, winning one award. "You Are Not Alone" was nominated for Best Pop Vocal Performance – Male and for Song of the Year. "Scream" was nominated for Best Pop Collaboration with Vocals and "Scream" won Best Music Video - Short Form and "Earth Song" was nominated for the same award the following year. The album itself was nominated for Album of the Year. At the 1995 MTV Video Music Awards, "Scream" received ten nominations, winning in three categories. In 1998, the album was ranked at number 96 in BBC's Music of the Millennium, a list of 100 albums chosen by Channel 4 viewers, The Guardian readers and HMV customers as the best of the millennium.

Track listing 

Notes
  signifies a co-producer
 Reissues of the album contain several changes when compared to the original 1995 US release: 
 "They Don't Care About Us" - "Jew me" and "Kike me" would be substituted with "do me" and "strike me" in most re-releases of the song, while the music video and some copies of the album still carry the original words, but with loud, abstract noises partially drowning them out.
 "History" - original musical compositions sampled include "Beethoven Lives Upstairs" and "The Great Gate of Kyiv" from Pictures at an Exhibition, but in reissues of the album, the Pictures at an Exhibition piece was replaced by a similar improvised orchestra piece.

Personnel 
Adapted from the album's liner notes and AllMusic.

 Gary Adante – keyboards, synthesizer
 Yannick Allain – staff
 Trini Alvarez Jr. – assistant engineer
 Maxi Anderson – choir conductor
 Rob Arbitter – keyboards, synthesizer
 Ryan Arnold – assistant engineer
 Gloria Augustus – background vocals
 Dallas Austin – arranger, keyboards, producer, synthesizer
 John Bahler – vocal arrangement, background vocals
 John Bahler Singers – background vocals
 Tom Bahler – synclavier
 Bettye Bailey – staff
 Glen Ballard – keyboards, rhythm arrangements, synthesizer, synthesizer arrangements
 Brian Banks – keyboards, synthesizer, synthesizer programming
 John Barnes – keyboards, piano, synthesizer, vocal arrangement
 Elmer Bernstein – conductor, orchestral arrangements
 Emily Bernstein – orchestration
 Tony Duino Black – assistant engineer
 Michael Boddicker – choir conductor, keyboards, programming, sound design, synthesizer, synthesizer programming
 Bill Bottrell – drums, engineer, guitar, keyboards, mixing, percussion, producer, synthesizer
 Jeff Bova – programming, synthesizer programming
 Crystal Bowers – executive assistant
 Boyz II Men – guest artist, background vocals
 Miko Brando – staff
 Bobby Brooks – drums, engineer, percussion, programming, sound design, synthesizer programming
 Ollie E. Brown – percussion
 Chauna Bryant – children's chorus, choir/chorus
 Rodger Bumpass – background vocals, voiceover
 Brad Buxer – arranger, keyboards, orchestration, percussion, piano, programming, sequencing arranger, sound effects, soundscape, synthesizer, synthesizer programming
 Caleena Campbell – children's chorus, choir/chorus
 Bruce Cannon – effects, special effects
 Larry Carlton – guitar
 Reeve Carney – children's chorus, choir/chorus
 Reagans Carter – artwork, photography
 Lafayette Carthon – keyboards, synthesizer
 Jim Champagne – assistant engineer
 Leon "Ndugu" Chancler – drums
 Charlie Chaplin – tributee
 Rosemary Chavira – staff
 Wayne Cobham – synthesizer programming
 Lester Cohen – artwork, photography
 David Coleman – art direction
 Funkmaster Flex – turntables
 Jesse Corti – background vocals, voiceover
 Richard Cottrell – engineer
 Andraé Crouch – vocal arrangement, background vocals
 The Andraé Crouch Singers – background vocals
 Sandra Crouch – background vocals
 Christopher Currell – guitar, percussion, rhythm arrangements, synclavier
 Paulinho Da Costa – percussion
 Rick Dasher – assistant engineer
 Eddie DeLena – engineer, mixing
 Jeff DeMorris – assistant engineer
 Carol Dennis – background vocals
 Carolyn Dennis – background vocals
 Nancy Donald – art direction
 Nathan East – bass
 Sheila E. – percussion
 Bill Easystone – assistant engineer
 Felipe Elgueta – engineer
 Sam Emerson – artwork, photography
 Jonathan Exley – artwork, photography
 Ashley Farrell – voiceover
 Steve Ferrone – drums, percussion
 Angela Fisher – children's chorus, choir/chorus
 Matt Forger – engineer, sound effects, soundscape, technical director
 David Foster – keyboards, orchestral arrangements, piano, producer, synthesizer, synthesizer arrangements
 Jania Foxworth – children's chorus, choir/chorus
 Simon Franglen – drums, keyboards, percussion, programming, synclavier programming, synthesizer, synthesizer programming
 Leah Frazier – soloist
 Harrison Funk – artwork, photography
 Eric Gale – guitar
 Gus Garces – assistant engineer
 Siedah Garrett – duet, guest artist, performer, primary artist, vocal harmony
 Humberto Gatica – engineer
 Peter Germansen – assistant engineer
 Douglas Getschall – drum programming, programming
 Kevin Gilbert – engineer, synthesizer programming
 Jim Gilstrap – background vocals
 Nate Giorgio – artwork, photography
 Carl Glanville – assistant engineer
 Greg Gorman – artwork, photography
 Jackie Gouché – background vocals
 Geoff Grace – orchestration
 Crystal Grant – children's chorus
 Gary Grant – flugelhorn, horn, trumpet
 Nikisha Grier – children's chorus, choir/chorus
 Doug Grigsby – bass
 Bernie Grundman – mastering
 Stephanie Gylden – assistant engineer
 Omar Hakim – drums, percussion
 Natalia Harris – children's chorus
 Amy Hartman – staff
 Gary Hearne – staff
 Richard Heath – percussion
 Gorrfried Helnwein – artwork, photography
 Marlo Henderson – guitar
 Jerry Hey – conductor, flugelhorn, horn, horn arrangements, string arrangements, synthesizer arrangements, trumpet
 Steve Hodge – engineer, mixing
 Rob Hoffman – assistant engineer, engineer, guitar, programming, synthesizer programming
 Jean Marie Horvat – Engineer
 Rhonda Hoskins – children's chorus
 How Now Brown Cow – percussion
 Dann Huff – guitar
 Bunny Hull – background vocals
 Kim Hutchcroft – flute, horn, saxophone
 James Ingram – background vocals
 Crystal Jackson – children's chorus, choir/chorus
 Janet Jackson – duet vocals, producer, vocal arrangement, background vocals
 Michael Jackson – arranger, director, drums, executive producer, guitar, horn arrangements, keyboard arrangements, keyboards, liner notes, percussion, primary artist, producer, rhythm arrangements, sequencing arranger, string arrangements, synthesizer, synthesizer arrangements, vocal arrangements, vocals, background vocals
 Paul Jackson Jr. – guitar
 Randy Jackson – percussion
 Terry Jackson – bass
 Jimmy Jam – arranger, drum programming, drums, keyboards, percussion, producer, programming, synthesizer, synthesizer bass, synthesizer programming, vocal arrangement
 Mortonette Jenkins – background vocals
 Augie Johnson – background vocals
 Craig Johnson – assistant technical director, engineer, technical director
 Kandy Johnson – children's chorus, choir/chorus
 Kimberly Johnson – children's chorus, choir/chorus
 Louis Johnson – bass
 Marcus Johnson – staff
 Brian Jones – children's chorus, choir/chorus
 Caryn Jones – children's chorus
 Quincy Jones – producer, rhythm arrangements, synthesizer arrangements, vocal arrangement
 Nathan Kaproff – orchestral coordinator
 Suzie Katayama – conductor
 R. Kelly – arranger, keyboards, producer, synthesizer, background vocals
 Jacqueline Kennedy – liner notes
 Randy Kerber – keyboards, synthesizer
 Donn Landee – engineer
 Christa Larson – background vocals
 Julie Last – assistant engineer
 Annie Leibovitz – artwork, photography
 Jen Leigh – guitar
 Jesse Levy – orchestral coordinator
 Terry Lewis – arranger, drum programming, drums, keyboards, percussion, producer, programming, synthesizer, synthesizer bass, synthesizer programming, vocal arrangement
 Becky Lopez – background vocals
 Bryan Loren – drums, percussion, synthesizer bass, background vocals
 Ron Lowe – assistant engineer
 L.T.B. – rap, voiceover
 Jeremy Lubbock – arranger, conductor
 Steve Lukather – bass, guitar
 Jonathan Mackey – piano
 Brian Malouf – engineer
 Johnny Mandel – arranger, string arrangements
 Gregg Mangiafico – programming, synthesizer programming
 Maurice La Marche – voiceover
 Glen Marchese – assistant engineer
 Anthony Marinelli – synthesizer programming
 Gregory Martin – background vocals, voiceover
 Jasun Martz – keyboards, synthesizer
 Harry Maslin – engineer
 Anna Mathias – background vocals, voiceover
 Coi Mattison – children's chorus
 Paul McCartney – duet vocals, vocal harmony
 Michael McCary – background vocals
 Linda McCrary – background vocals
 Andres McKenzie – voiceover
 Dawn McMillan – voiceover
 Paulette McWilliams – background vocals
 Daniel Medvedev – narrator
 Jason Miles – programming, synthesizer programming
 Jeff Mirinov – guitar
 Peter Mokran – drum programming, engineer, programming, synthesizer programming
 Nathan Morris – background vocals
 Wanya Morris – background vocals
 Wayne Nagin – staff
 Carl Nappa – assistant engineer
 David Nordahl – artwork, photography
 The Notorious B.I.G. – guest artist, rap
 David Nottingham – assistant engineer
 Shaquille O'Neal – guest artist, rap
 Gary Olazabal – engineer
 Claudio Ordenes – engineer
 David Paich – bass, keyboards, piano, rhythm arrangements, synthesizer, synthesizer arrangements
 Marty Paich – conductor, orchestral arrangements
 Chris Palmaro – synthesizer programming
 Dean Parks – guitar
 Paul Peabody – soloist, violin
 Wayne Pedzwater – bass
 Greg Phillinganes – fender rhodes, keyboards, rhythm arrangements, synthesizer, synthesizer bass
 Tim Pierce – guitar
 Scott Pittinsky – sound design, synthesizer programming
 Jeff Porcaro – drums
 Steve Porcaro – keyboards, orchestral realizations, programming, synthesizer, synthesizer programming
 Crystal Pounds – children's chorus, choir/chorus
 Guy Pratt – bass
 Markita Prescott – soloist
 Vincent Price – rap
 Phil Proctor – background vocals
 Phillip G. Proctor – voiceover
 Trevor Rabin – guitar
 Ronald Reagan – quotation author
 William Frank "Bill" Reichenbach Jr. – horn, trombone
 Rene – drums, keyboards, percussion, producer, synthesizer
 Seth Riggs – vocal consultant
 Teddy Riley – engineer, keyboards, mixing, producer, rhythm arrangements, synthesizer, synthesizer arrangements
 Chris Roberts – assistant engineer
 John Robinson – drums
 Nile Rodgers – guitar
 Matthew Rolston – artwork, photography
 Bill Ross – conductor, orchestral arrangements
 Darryl Ross – sound design, synthesizer programming
 William Ross – conductor
 Keith Rouster – bass
 Thom Russo – technical director
 Grace Rwaramba – staff
 Annette Sanders – choir conductor
 Andrew Scheps – drum programming, engineer, programming, sound effects, soundscape, synclavier programming, synthesizer programming
 Arnie Schulze – programming, synthesizer programming
 Seawind Horns – horn
 Jamie Seyberth – assistant engineer
 Scott "House" Shaffer – staff
 Joshua Shapera – assistant engineer
 Alan Shearman – background vocals, voiceover
 Rick Sheppard – programming, synthesizer programming
 Susan Silo – voiceover
 Slash – guest artist, guitar
 Greg Smith – keyboards, synthesizer
 Jimmy Smith – hammond b3, organ (hammond), soloist
 Rachel Smith – production coordination
 Steven Spielberg – liner notes
 Tracy Spindler – children's chorus, choir/chorus
 Brandi Stewart – children's chorus, choir/chorus
 Shawn Stockman – background vocals
 Brad Sundberg – engineer, mixing, technical director
 Gabriel Sutter – assistant engineer
 Bruce Swedien – arranger, drums, effects, engineer, liner notes, mixing, percussion, producer, sound effects, soundscape, special effects
 Roberta Swedien – sound design, synthesizer programming
 Evvy Tavasci – assistant, executive administrator
 Elizabeth Taylor – liner notes, quotation author
 Jeff Taylor – assistant engineer
 Rod Temperton – keyboards, rhythm arrangements, synthesizer, synthesizer arrangements, vocal arrangement
 Chris Theis – assistant engineer
 Michael Thompson – guitar
 Jonathon Ungar – children's chorus
 Eddie Van Halen – guest artist, guitar
 John VanNest – engineer
 Llyswen Vaughan – sample clearance
 Suzy Vaughan – sample clearance
 Stephan Vaughn – artwork, photography
 Tata Vega – background vocals
 Brian Vibberts – assistant engineer
 Gerald Vinci – concert master
 Diana Walczak – sculpture
 Randy Waldman – keyboards, synthesizer
 Stephen Walker – art direction
 Ben Wallach – assistant engineer
 Dan Wallin – engineer
 Julia Waters – background vocals
 Maxine Waters – background vocals
 Oren Waters – background vocals
 Bobby Watson – bass
 Dave Way – engineer, mixing
 Steven Paul Whitsitt – artwork, photography
 Ed Wiesnieski – narrator
 Chuck Wild – drums, keyboards, percussion, programming, sound design, sound effects, soundscape, synthesizer, synthesizer programming
 Maxine Willard Waters – background vocals
 Buddy Williams – drums, percussion
 David Williams – guitar
 Larry Williams – flute, horn, saxophone, synthesizer programming
 Zedric Williams – background vocals
 The Winans – background vocals
 Hattie Winston – background vocals, voiceover
 Colin Wolfe – bass
 Bill Wolfer – keyboards, synthesizer, synthesizer programming
 David "Hawk" Wolinski – fender rhodes
 Ben Wright – string arrangements
 James "Big Jim" Wright – organ, piano
 Jimmy Wright – organ, piano
 Charity Young – children's chorus, choir/chorus

Charts

Weekly charts

Year-end charts

Certifications and sales

See also
 HIStory World Tour
 List of best-selling albums
 List of best-selling albums in Colombia
 List of best-selling albums in Europe
 List of best-selling albums in France
 List of best-selling albums in Germany
 List of number-one albums of 1995 (U.S.)
 List of number-one R&B albums of 1995 (U.S.)

References

Bibliography

External links

1995 albums
2001 compilation albums
Michael Jackson albums
Michael Jackson compilation albums
Albums produced by Michael Jackson
Albums produced by Bill Bottrell
Albums produced by Dallas Austin
Albums produced by David Foster
Albums produced by Jimmy Jam and Terry Lewis
Albums produced by R. Kelly
Epic Records albums
Epic Records compilation albums